Persipangkep stands for Persatuan Sepakbola Indonesia Pangkajene Kepulauan (en: Football Association of Indonesia Pangkajene and Islands). Persipangkep Pangkajene Kepulauan is an  Indonesian football club based in Pangkajene and Islands Regency, South Sulawesi. They currently compete in the Liga 3.

Honours
 Habibie Cup XVIII Parepare
 Champion: 2008
 Liga 3 South Sulawesi
 Third-place: 2018

References

External links

Sport in South Sulawesi
Football clubs in Indonesia
Football clubs in South Sulawesi
Association football clubs established in 1962
1962 establishments in Indonesia